Lewisham College is a further education college in the London Borough of Lewisham, south-east London. It was established in 1990, having previously been known as SELTEC (South East London College of Technology) since the early 1970s, which was run by the Inner London Education Authority. The college has two campuses, its main one on Lewisham Way in Brockley, and another one in Church Street, Deptford.

History

The Deptford campus of the college opened in 1996.

Lewisham College and Southwark College merged in 2012, having previously existed as separate institutions. Between 2013 and 2014 the college was branded as LeSoCo, before this was dropped. It was then known as Lewisham Southwark College between 2014 and 2018, becoming part of Newcastle College Group in 2017. In October 2018 it was announced by Newcastle College Group (NCG) that Lewisham Southwark College would return to being two separate institutions: Lewisham College and Southwark College.

Students
The college has 16,000 student enrolments and 36,000 course enrolments. The college was a member of the 157 Group (now the Collab Group) of high performing schools. The college mainly serves students living in the local communities of Lewisham, Greenwich and Southwark,

39% study full-time
61% part-time
Average age 29
57% from ethnic minorities
41% from Lewisham
13% from Southwark
11% from Greenwich
59% male 41% female
644 full-time equivalent staff
2 campuses

Notable alumni

Lewisham College
Daniel Bedingfield, musician
georgemizen, Actor
Duwayne Brooks, Liberal Democrat politician
Thomas Caterer, pioneer schoolteacher
Max Gradel, footballer
Keeley Hazell, model and actress
Leon Lai, Hong Kong actor and singer
Shakira Martin, President of NUS
Suzanne May, actress
Novelist, grime MC
Shaun Parkes, actor
Mark Linscott, professional superbike racer (British Champion 1990)
Georgia South, musician/bassist of Nova Twins

References

External links
 https://www.lewisham.ac.uk/

Further education colleges in London
Education in the London Borough of Lewisham
Learning and Skills Beacons